The Chelsea-Elliott Houses is a combined housing project of the New York City Housing Authority (NYCHA), located between West 25th and 27th Streets and Ninth and Tenth Avenues in the Chelsea neighborhood of Manhattan, New York City. It consists of two contiguous projects which were originally separate but have been combined for administrative purposes: the John Lovejoy Elliott Houses, named after the founder of the Hudson Guild, has four 11- and 12-story buildings which accommodate over 1400 residents in 589 apartments. The Chelsea Houses has over 1,000 residents in 426 apartments within two 21-story buildings.

About 
Prior to development, the Elliott Houses were criticized by the United States Housing Authority who cited the land value being higher than other housing projects. NYCHA broke ground in December 1945 and were completed on July 15, 1947. Designed by William Lescaze, they were one of the first examples of high rise tower in the park style. The Chelsea Houses were designed by architect Paul L. Wood and construction started in 1961 and completed on May 31, 1964. The Chelsea Houses were aided by the state for $8.3 million.

In 2012, NYCHA converted a parking lot in the development into a 168 unit building for low-to-middle-income households.

Notable people 
Stephanie Andujar (born 1986), actor
 Antonio Fargas (born 1946), actor
 Whoopi Goldberg (born 1955), actor
 Wayans Family (lived there in the 1970s and 1980s), comedians

See also
New York City Housing Authority
List of New York City Housing Authority properties

References

External links

NYCHA webpage

Residential buildings in Manhattan
Public housing in Manhattan
Chelsea, Manhattan
Residential buildings completed in 1947
Residential buildings completed in 1964